Keymer Tiles is a traditional producer of clay roof tiles founded in 1588 and located in Burgess Hill, United Kingdom.
 It is a subsidiary of the Austrian company Wienerberger. The company is known for its traditional red terracotta roof tiles.

See also
List of oldest companies

References

External links
Official Website
Tiles, Steps & Slabs Of Quartz Stone

Roof tiles
Manufacturing companies of the United Kingdom
Companies established in the 16th century
Companies based in West Sussex